Son of the Guardsman is an American film serial released in 1946 by Columbia Pictures. It was the 31st of the 57 serials produced by that studio.

Son of the Guardsman is a rare serial with a period setting, in this case 12th century England.  The serial is largely based on the Robin Hood legends, to the extent of including outlaws from Sherwood Forest, but it does not include or reference Robin Hood himself.

The serial was produced by the notoriously cheap Sam Katzman and directed by Derwin Abrahams.  Bob Shaw starred as the heroic noble-turned-outlaw David Trent with Charles King as his villainous uncle Sir Edgar Bullard.

Plot
Set in the High Middle Ages, Sir Edgar Bullard conspires to conquer England.  In doing so, he kidnaps the daughter of his rival, Lord Markham.  This causes his nephew, David Trent, to turn against him and join the outlaws in Sherwood Forest, who are led by Allan Hawk.  Meanwhile, the outlaws of the forest support Prince Richard as the rightful ruler of England, who has been usurped by the regent Lord Hampton.

Cast
 Bob Shaw as David Trent, nobleman turned outlaw
 Daun Kennedy as Lady Louise Markham, daughter of Lord Markham
 Robert 'Buzz' Henry as "Roger Mowbry", really Prince Richard in disguise
 Jim Diehl as Allan Hawk, leader of the Sherwood Forest outlaws
 Hugh Prosser as Red Robert
 Leonard Penn as Mark Crowell
 Jock Mahoney as Captain Kenley
 Charles King as Sir Edgar Bullard, David Trent's evil uncle
 John Merton as Lord Hampton, the evil regent

Production
Son of the Guardsman is based on the Robin Hood legends, although it does not include Robin Hood, just the period and Sherwood Forest setting.  The serial was made to use costumes and sets left over from feature films, amortising the costs of all the productions involved. Costume drama serials were rare productions for any producer. The serial's subtle was "Gallant Fighter of the Greenwood."

Stunts
 Jock Mahoney

Chapter titles
 Outlaws of Sherwood Forest
 Perils of the Forest
 Blazing Barrier
 The Siege of Bullard Hall
 A Dagger in the Dark
 A Fight for Freedom
 Trial by Torture
 Mark Crowell's Treachery
 Crushed to Earth
 A Throne at Stake
 Double Danger
 The Secret of the Treasure
 Into the Depths
 The Lost Heritage
 Free Men Triumph
Source:

See also
 List of film serials by year
 List of film serials by studio

References

External links
 
 

1946 films
1946 adventure films
American black-and-white films
Columbia Pictures film serials
1940s English-language films
Films set in the 12th century
Films set in Nottinghamshire
American adventure films
Films with screenplays by Harry L. Fraser
Films with screenplays by George H. Plympton
Films directed by Derwin Abrahams
1940s American films